The Portuguese Sports Association of Saint-Barthelemy (French: Association Sportive Portugaise de Saint-Barthelemy) (shortened to ASPSB) is a multi-sport Barthélemois club located in Gustavia, Saint Barthélemy. The club is best known for their football program, which competes in the Saint-Barthelemy Championships, the top-tier of football on the island. With five titles, they are the most successful Barthelemois club in the competition's history.

ASPSB is the most recent recipient of the league title, winning the competition in 2017.

Teams

Senior team 
ASPSB's main men's team.

Veteran team 
Over 30 team.

Feminine team 
Women's team.

Honours 
 Saint-Barthelemy Championships:
 Winners (5): 2007–08, 2008–09, 2009–10, 2010–11, 2016–17

 Taça Jose Veiga da Silva
 Winners (1): 2016

References

External links 
 Official Website (in French)

Aspsb
Gustavia, Saint Barthélemy